James Jackson (October 18, 1819 – January 13, 1887) was a United States Representative from Georgia, a judge advocate in the American Civil War, and a chief justice of the Supreme Court of Georgia. Jackson was also a trustee of the University of Georgia. He was the son of William Henry Jackson (see Tree That Owns Itself), the grandson of Georgia governor James Jackson, the nephew of Congressman Jabez Young Jackson and first cousin of Howell Cobb.

Jackson was born in Jefferson County, Georgia and named for his famous grandfather. He attended the University of Georgia and graduated in 1837. After passing the bar examination in 1839, he began to practice law in Athens, Georgia. He was elected to the Georgia House of Representatives and served from 1845 to 1849. He concurrently served as judge of the superior court from 1846 to 1859. In 1857, was elected as a Democrat to the Thirty-fifth and Thirty-sixth United States Congresses and served from March 4, 1857, until January 23, 1861. With the secession of Georgia from the Union, he resigned from Congress.

Jackson served as judge advocate on the staff of General Stonewall Jackson. After the war he moved to Macon, Georgia to practice law again. In 1875, he was appointed associate justice of the Supreme Court of Georgia and moved to Atlanta, Georgia. He was named as chief justice of the State supreme court in 1880 and served in this position until his death.

References
Footnotes

Sources
History of the Supreme Court of Georgia

1819 births
1887 deaths
University of Georgia alumni
Chief Justices of the Supreme Court of Georgia (U.S. state)
Democratic Party members of the United States House of Representatives from Georgia (U.S. state)
American slave owners
19th-century American politicians
19th-century American judges